The Fifth Horseman may refer to:

 The Fifth Horseman, a 1924 film starring Una Merkel
 The Fifth Horseman, a 1974 novel by José Antonio Villarreal
 The Fifth Horseman, a 1976 novel by Walter Harris
 The Fifth Horseman (novel), a 1980 novel by Larry Collins and Dominique Lapierre
 "The Fifth Horseman" (X-Men episode), 1996–97
 The 5th Horseman, a 2006 novel by James Patterson and Maxine Paetro
 The Fifth Horseman and the New MAD, a 2022 book by Harlan K. Ullman
 In the context of the Four Horsemen of New Atheism, Ayaan Hirsi Ali is referred to as the Fifth Horseman or One Horse-Woman

See also

The Third Horseman (TV episode), 2002 season 1 episode 11 of Law&Order:Criminal Intent
 The Fourth Horseman (disambiguation)
 Four Horsemen (disambiguation)
 Horseman (disambiguation)